The sport of football in the country of Zanzibar is run by the Zanzibar Football Association. The association administers the national football team, as well as the Zanzibar Premier League.

References